Duygu Düzceler (born 6 April 1990, İstanbul) is a  Aydın Büyükşehir Belediyespor volleyball player. She is plays as setter.

Career
Duygu Düzceler's career begins in the youth sector of VakıfBank GS, where he plays before moving to the United States of America for study purposes , where he plays at university level in NCAA Division I with Florida State University, since 2009 to 2012 . As soon as he completed his university commitments, in January 2013 he signed his first professional contract in the Turkish cadet division , playing the second part of the 2012-13 championship with Salihli.

Makes her debut in Voleybol 1. Ligi in the 2013-14 season , signed by Bursa Büyükşehir Belediyespor : she remains tied to the club for two years, winning the 2014-15 Challenge Cup . In the 2015-16 championship he moved to Çanakkale Belediyespor, while in the following championship he moved to Nilüfer Belediyespor for two years .

In the 2018-19 season she arrives at Aydın Büyükşehir Belediyespor: shortly after the start of the 2020-21 season she gets injured, breaking the anterior cruciate ligament of her right knee, thus being forced to undergo surgery and a long stop.

Awards

Clubs
 2014–15 CEV Women's Challenge Cup  Champion, with Bursa Büyükşehir Belediyespor
 2018–19 CEV Women's Challenge Cup  Runner-Up, with Aydın Büyükşehir Belediyespor

External links

See also
Turkish women in sports

References

1990 births
Living people
Turkish women's volleyball players
Turkish expatriate volleyball players
Volleyball players from Istanbul
Aydın Büyükşehir Belediyespor volleyballers